"Winner Takes It All  " is a 1987 rock song written by record producer Giorgio Moroder and Thomas Whitlock and recorded by Sammy Hagar. Originally was included in the soundtrack of the Sylvester Stallone movie Over the Top, being the first track and second single from the album, released through CBS Records. The song peaked at No. 3 on the Billboard Album Rock Tracks chart and No. 54 on their Hot 100 chart. It appears in Hagar's 2004 compilation album The Essential Red Collection.

Background 
In late 1986,  producer / director of the film Over the Top Menahem Golan chose prestigious Italian composer and record producer Giorgio Moroder as music supervisor of the soundtrack. Moroder was in charge of creating a concept album with a compilation of new songs in different genres and diverse artists, writing most tracks on the album himself in collaboration with Tom Whitlock.

Originally, Moroder contacted  John Wetton, lead singer of the rock group Asia, to sing "Winner Takes It All" for the film, but after performing the song, it was felt that his voice wasn't "mean" enough. Instead, the song was offered to Sammy Hagar, by then the successful new lead singer in Van Halen, and he was given the opportunity to choose his own session musicians.

Hagar's version features a bass guitar solo interlude by Hagar's then-bandmate Eddie Van Halen. Denny Carmassi —a longtime friend of Hagar and ex-bandmate in Montrose—also played on the track.

"Winner Takes It All" was never included on a Sammy Hagar solo studio album and it did not appear in most of his authorized compilations. Hagar said in his video commentary for the DVD The Long Road to Cabo that he was unenthusiastic about the song, being focused on his career with Van Halen, and being used to recording his own songs.

Music video
The song's music video was made via Geffen Records – then Hagar's record label – although its director was not officially accredited. It shows Sammy Hagar performs the song with his guitar, as well as a mix of some of the most vibrant scenes of the film.

The music video opens with Hagar running barefoot to the camera and playing guitar. As he sings the song, clips from the film play throughout. In the end, Hagar arm wrestles with Sylvester Stallone's character, Lincoln Hawk, and Hagar wins.

He said that Stallone gave him his black cap at the end of the shoot of the music video, both signed it, and the cap went to charity, fetching around $10,000.

Track listing 
"Winner Takes It All" – 3:58
"The Fight" (Instrumental) –  3:55

Personnel 
Sammy Hagar – vocals, lead guitar 
Edward Van Halen – rhythm guitar, bass, backing vocals 
Denny Carmassi – drums
Giorgio Moroder – synthesizer
Edward Van Halen, Sammy Hagar – producers

References

External links
Discogs listing

1987 singles
1987 songs
Sammy Hagar songs
Songs written by Giorgio Moroder
Columbia Records singles